Skylink Arabia was a charter airline based in Dubai, United Arab Emirates. Its main base was Dubai International Airport.

Destinations
Skylink operated the following services (as of March 2009):

 Jordan
Amman (Queen Alia International Airport)
 United Arab Emirates
Dubai (Dubai International Airport)

Fleet
The Sklylink fleet includes the following aircraft (as of November 2010) :

1 Boeing 737-300 (which is operated by East Air)
1 Fokker F28 Mk4000 (which is operated by AirQuarius Aviation)
1 Fokker 70 (which is operated by AirQuarius Aviation)
1 Saab 340B (which is operated by Norse Air)

References

External links

SkyLink Arabia Fleet

Defunct airlines of the United Arab Emirates